Sir William Somerville KBE FRSE LLD (1860–1932) was a 19th/20th century Scottish agriculturalist. He is one of the few academics to have taught at both Cambridge University and Oxford University. He was twice President of the Arboricultural Society: 1900–1901 and 1922–1924.

Life
He was born in Cormiston near Biggar in Lanarkshire on 30 May 1860 the son of Robert Somerville JP (died 1879) a farmer, and his wife, Margaret Alexander.

He was educated at the Royal High School, Edinburgh then went to work on his father's farm.

From 1885 he studied at Edinburgh University graduating BSc then did postgraduate studies at the University of Munich receiving a doctorate (DOec) in 1889. In 1891 he was appointed as Professor of Agriculture and Forestry at the University of Newcastle-upon-Tyne. At Newcastle he set up a new facility at Cockle Park Farm.

In 1899 he transferred to be Professor of Agriculture at Cambridge University. He left Cambridge in 1902 and in 1906 became Professor of Rural Economy at Oxford University. He was the first full-time professor to hold this title.

In 1888 he was elected a Fellow of the Royal Society of Edinburgh. His proposers were Alexander Crum Brown, Robert Wallace, James Geikie, and John Gibson.

In retired in 1926 and later that year was created a Knight of the Order of the British Empire (KBE) by King George V. His position at Oxford was filled by Prof James Anderson Scott Watson.

He died of pneumonia on 17 February 1932 at Boar's Hill in Oxford.

Family
In 1888 he married Margaret Elizabeth ("Eliza") Gaukroger, daughter of George Gaukroger JP.

References

1860 births
1932 deaths
People from Lanarkshire
Alumni of the University of Edinburgh
Academics of the University of Cambridge
Academics of the University of Oxford
British agriculturalists
Fellows of the Royal Society of Edinburgh
Knights Commander of the Order of the British Empire